Holmesville is an unincorporated community in New Durham Township, LaPorte County, Indiana.

History
A post office was established at Holmesville in 1854, and remained in operation until it was discontinued in 1895. Holmesville was platted in 1855 by Hiram Holmes, and named for him.

Geography

References

Unincorporated communities in LaPorte County, Indiana
Unincorporated communities in Indiana